is a Japanese  manga artist. She won the magazine's gold medal for amateur manga artists. Afterwards, Kuramochi studied Japanese painting at Musashino Art University, but left before graduation to pursue her career full-time.

Her manga Tennen Kokekkō received the 1996 Kodansha Manga Award for  manga, and was adapted as a live-action movie in 2007. Her series A-Girl was adapted as an anime OVA in 1993. Her manga Hana ni Somu won the Grand Prize category of the 21st Tezuka Osamu Cultural Prize in 2017.

References

External links 
 
 Profile  at The Ultimate Manga Page

Female comics writers
Japanese female comics artists
Manga artists from Tokyo
Living people
People from Shibuya
Winner of Kodansha Manga Award (Shōjo)
Winner of Tezuka Osamu Cultural Prize (Grand Prize)
Women manga artists
Year of birth missing (living people)